Boneh-ye Azim (also Romanized as Boneh-ye ‘Az̧īm) is a village in Sardarabad Rural District, in the Central District of Shushtar County, Khuzestan Province, Iran. At the 2006 census, its population was 497, in 82 families.

References 

Populated places in Shushtar County